Myanmar (also known as Burma) is a member of the Southeast Asian Zone of the Olympic Council of Asia (OCA), and has participated in the Asian Games since the inception of the Games in 1951. The Myanmar Olympic Committee, established in 1947 and recognised in the same year by the International Olympic Committee, is the National Olympic Committee for Myanmar.

Myanmar was one of the first five founding members of the Asian Games Federation on 13 February 1949, in New Delhi; the organisation was disbanded on 26 November 1981 and replaced by the Olympic Council of Asia.

Membership of Olympic Council of Asia
Myanmar is a member of the South East Asian Zone of the Olympic Council of Asia, the governing body of all the sports in Asia, recognised by the International Olympic Committee as the continental association of Asia. Being a member of the South East Asian Zone, Myanmar also participates in the South East Asian Games, sub-regional Games for South East Asia.

The OCA organises five major continental-level multi-sport events: the Asian Summer Games (which are commonly known as the Asian Games), Asian Winter Games, Asian Indoor-Martial Arts Games, Asian Beach Games, and Asian Youth Games. Before 2009, Indoor and Martial Arts were two separate events, specialised for indoor and martial arts sports respectively. However, since then the OCA has amalgamated them into a single event, the Asian Indoor-Martial Arts Games, which will be debuted in 2013 in Incheon, South Korea. As a member of OCA, Myanmar is privileged to participate in all these multi-sport events.

Summer Games results

Myanmar has participated in all the editions of the Asian Games except in the 1986 Games in Seoul. As of the latest Games, in incheon in 2014, Myanmar has won a total of 16 gold, 31 silver, and 53 bronze medals.

Medals By Game

Indoor Games results

Myanmar has sent its delegates to all editions of the Asian Indoor Games. The 2007 Games in Macau, held from 26 October to 3 November 2007, were the only revision of the Games in which Myanma athletes won medals (two silver). Myanmar did not medal at the 2005 and 2009 Asian Indoor Games.

Beach Games results

Myanma contingents have competed in both the editions of the Asian Beach Games—a biennial multi-sport event which features sporting events played on sea beach. Myanmar finished in ninth place in the 2008 Games in Bali, winning a total of five medals (including two gold). Two silvers were won by Myanma athletes during the 2010 Games in Muscat, and the nation fell to the 17th spot in the final medal table standings.

Martial Arts Games results

Myanmar competed in the First Asian Martial Arts Games held in Bangkok, Thailand, from 1 to 9 August 2009. Two medals were won by Myanmar in the Games, one silver and a bronze, leading to the country finishing 28th in the medal table.

Youth Games results

Myanmar sent a delegation to the 2009 Asian Youth Games, the first edition of the Games, held in Singapore from 29 June to 7 July 2009. Myanmar won a bronze medal in the Games, finishing in last place (21st) in the medal table.

See also

Myanmar at the Olympics
Myanmar at the Paralympics
Myanmar at the Asian Para Games
Myanmar at the Southeast Asian Games

Notes and references
Notes

 The National Olympic Committees are all members of the Association of National Olympic Committees (ANOC), which is also split among five continental associations: Association of National Olympic Committees of Africa, Pan American Sports Organization, Olympic Council of Asia, European Olympic Committees, and Oceania National Olympic Committees.

References